Happy Love is a 1981 album by American singer Natalie Cole. Released on July 18, 1981, it was her final album on Capitol Records. The album reached peak positions of number 132 on the Billboard 200 and number 37 on Billboard R&B Albums chart.

Track listing
 "You Were Right Girl" (Gary Goetzman, Mike Piccirillo) - 3:16
 "Only Love" (Gary Goetzman, Mike Piccirillo) - 3:44
 "Nothin' But a Fool" (Bill Amesbury) - 4:20
 "The Joke Is On You" (Eddie Cole, Natalie Cole) - 3:22
 "These Eyes" (Burton Cummings, Randy Bachman) - 3:37
 "When a Man Loves a Woman" (Andrew Wright, Calvin Lewis) - 3:47
 "I Can't Let Go" (Gary Goetzman, Mike Piccirillo) - 3:07
 "Love and Kisses" (Natalie Cole) - 3:43
 "Across the Nation" (Mark Davis, Natalie Cole) - 5:16

Personnel 

 Natalie Cole – lead vocals, arrangements (8, 9)
 Bill Cuomo – keyboards
 Eddie Cole – acoustic piano (4), Fender Rhodes (8), backing vocals
 Mike Piccirillo – synthesizers, guitars, backing vocals, arrangements (1-7)
 Chuck Bynum – guitars (8)
 Keni Burke – bass 
 Scott Edwards – bass 
 Ed Greene – drums
 Joel Peskin – saxophones
 Harry Kim – trumpet
 George Tobin – arrangements (1-7)
 Pat Henderson – backing vocals
 Julia Tillman Waters – backing vocals
 Maxine Willard Waters – backing vocals
 Anita Anderson – backing vocals (8)
 Yasmin "Sissy" Peoples – backing vocals (8)

Production 
 Produced and Mixed by Mike Piccirillo and George Tobin
 Assistant Producer – Richie Griffin
 Executive Producers – Kevin Hunter and Varnell Johnson
 Engineers – Howard Wolen and Mark Wolfson
 Assistant Engineer – John Volaitis
 Mastered by John Lemay at Capitol Studios (Hollywood, CA).
 Art Direction and Photography – Glen Christensen

References

1981 albums
Capitol Records albums
Natalie Cole albums